Antonio Lujan (born April 12, 1946) is a former member of the New Mexico House of Representatives. He represented the 35th District from 2002 to 2012.

External links
Antonio Lujan at the New Mexico legislature website
New Mexico State Representative Antonio Lujan

1946 births
Hispanic and Latino American state legislators in New Mexico
Living people
Democratic Party members of the New Mexico House of Representatives
Politicians from Las Cruces, New Mexico